Italiencele is a 2004 Romanian comedy film directed by Nap Toader.

Cast 
 Mara Nicolescu - Jeni
 Ana Ularu - Lenuta
  - Gigel
 Vlad Zamfirescu - Giovanni
 Emil Hostina - Fane
  - Girls' father
 Constantin Drăgănescu - Nea Chitu
 Valentin Teodosiu - Police officer

References

External links 

2004 comedy films
2004 films
Romanian comedy films